Eucrostes is a genus of moths in the family Geometridae. It was erected by Jacob Hübner in 1823.

Description
Palpi reaching just beyond the frons and roughly scaled. Antennae of male bipectinate (comb like on both sides) for two-thirds of their length. Hind tibia with one spur pair in both sexes. Forewings with veins 3 and 4 from angle of cell and vein 6 from upper angle. Veins 7, 8, 9 and 10 stalked and vein 11 anastomosing (fusing) with vein 12. Hindwings with frenulum absent. The outer margin rounded. Veins 3, 4 and 6, 7 stalked.

Species
 Eucrostes astigmatica L. B. Prout, 1916
 Eucrostes beatificata (Walker, 1863)
 Eucrostes disparata (Walker, 1861)
 Eucrostes indigenata (Villers, 1789) (Mediterranean)
 Eucrostes pygmaea Rebel, 1907
 Eucrostes rhodophthalma L. B. Prout, 1912
 Eucrostes rufociliaria Herrich-Schäffer, 1855
 Eucrostes solivaga Herbulot, 1972

Former species
Eucrostes kafebera Swinhoe, 1894 (from India)

References

Hemitheini
Geometrinae
Geometridae genera